"Voľný pád" is a song by Slovak singer Dara Rolins, featuring rap by Orion. The composition was released on March 3, 2008 as a download single and issued on the singer's remix album D2: Remixy from 2008.

Credits and personnel
 Dara Rolins - lead vocal
 Orion - rap
 DJ Trafic - remix

Charts

Peak positions

See also
 Dara Rolins discography

References

External links 
 

2008 singles
2008 songs
Sony BMG singles
Song articles with missing songwriters